CY Tech, formerly EISTI (École internationale des sciences du traitement de l'information), is a French graduate engineering school created in 1983.

It is located across three campuses (Cergy, Pau, Saint-Germain-en-Laye) and specialises in the fields of computer science, applied mathematics, biotechnology, chemistry and civil engineering. The college is a member of the University of Paris-Seine.

History 
In 1983, the École internationale des sciences du traitement de l'information (EISTI) was founded in Cergy. In 1989, EISTI was recognised by the State as a private higher-education establishment and created a charter: professionalism, openness, solidarity and ethics.

In 1992, EISTI obtained accreditation from the Commission des Titres d'Ingénieur (CTI) to deliver the title of Master's degree. Five years later, it became a member of the Union of Independent Grandes Écoles (UGEI). Then, in 2002, it became a member of the Conférence des Grandes écoles (CGE) and of the Conference of the Directors of French Engineering Schools (CDEFI).

In 2003, EISTI created a second campus in Pau delivering the same degree as the Cergy campus.

In 2020, EISTI merges with the Institut des Sciences et Techniques (IST) and the Institut d'Economie et de Gestion (IEG) of the Cergy-Pontoise University and becomes CY Tech, a grande école of science, engineering, economics and management of CY Cergy Paris University, which starts in September 2020.

Notable alumni 
 Maya Selva, a Honduran cigar maker and tobacco grower

References

External links 
 

Engineering universities and colleges in France
Grandes écoles
Buildings and structures in Pau